The Union Storage & Transfer Cold Storage Warehouse and Armour Creamery Building in Fargo, North Dakota, United States, was built in 1930.  It includes work by Fargo architect William F. Kurke.

References

External links 
 The Historic Union web site

Art Deco architecture in North Dakota
Buildings and structures in Fargo, North Dakota
Commercial buildings on the National Register of Historic Places in North Dakota
Industrial buildings completed in 1930
Industrial buildings and structures on the National Register of Historic Places in North Dakota
International style architecture in North Dakota
Warehouses on the National Register of Historic Places
National Register of Historic Places in Cass County, North Dakota
1930 establishments in North Dakota
Cool warehouses
Dairy products companies of the United States